Forest Flower: Charles Lloyd at Monterey is a live album by jazz saxophonist Charles Lloyd recorded at the Monterey Jazz Festival in 1966 by the Charles Lloyd Quartet featuring Keith Jarrett, Cecil McBee and Jack DeJohnette.

Reception
The Allmusic review by Thom Jurek awarded the album 5 stars and states "It is difficult to believe that, with players so young (and having been together under a year), Lloyd was able to muster a progressive jazz that was so far-reaching and so undeniably sophisticated, yet so rich and accessible... By the time the band reaches its final number they have touched upon virtually the entire history of jazz and still pushed it forward with seamless aplomb. Forest Flower is a great live record".

Track listing
 "Forest Flower: Sunrise" (Lloyd) - 7:18
 "Forest Flower: Sunset" (Lloyd) - 10:37
 "Sorcery" (Keith Jarrett) - 5:18  
 "Song of Her" (Cecil McBee) - 5:24
 "East of the Sun" (Brooks Bowman) - 10:40

Personnel
Charles Lloyd - tenor saxophone, flute
Keith Jarrett - piano
Cecil McBee - bass
Jack DeJohnette - drums

Production
Wally Heider - recording engineer
Marvin Israel - album design
Jim Marshall - cover photography

References

Charles Lloyd (jazz musician) live albums
1967 live albums
Albums produced by George Avakian
Atlantic Records live albums
Albums recorded at the Monterey Jazz Festival